Zubr was a civic youth organization in Belarusin opposition to President Alyaksandr Lukashenka. The organization drew inspiration from Otpor! student movement (formerly of Yugoslavia) which contributed to the overthrow of Slobodan Milošević in 2000, and from Gene Sharp's writings on nonviolent action. Zubr became noticed internationally in 2005 when US Secretary of State Condoleezza Rice, who was visiting Lithuania, met their leaders, who risked imprisonment upon their return. Some reporters have credited Zubr's leaders with the idea of a 'Denim Revolution', which, they hoped would attract popular support as Ukraine's Orange Revolution and Georgia's Rose Revolution. But, Lukashenko had said: "In our country, there will be no pink or orange, nor even a banana revolution".

Like many opposition activists, Zubr members are often harassed and imprisoned by Belarus's police and KGB. On 23 December 2005, Zubr activists Pavel Modzharo (Павел Моджаро), Aleksandr Morozov (Александр Морозов) and another colleague were arrested on suspicion of possessing drugs, which, they insisted, plainclothes security officers had planted on them. On 16 February 2006, Zubr leaders Aleh Myatselitsa and Pavel Yukhnevich were among the detained after a police break-up of a peaceful protest calling for the release of political prisoners. Two other members were arrested on 20 February for handing out stickers the same day.

During the 2006 presidential election Zubr had supported Alaksandar Milinkievič, the opposition United Democratic Forces of Belarus candidate. After international election monitors criticized the conduct of that election, there were several demonstrations at which protestors flew the Zubr flag next to the first post-independence Belarusian white-red-white tricolour and the EU flag.

After the elections in 2006, "Zubr" ceased its existence.

Polish Division of "Zubr" 
After the elections in 2001, some of activists went to emigration to Poland, where they met Polish enthusiasts of Belarusian opposition. Together, they made in few actions of support and solidarity for Belarusian democrats:

 demonstrations near Belarusian embassy in Warsaw in the anniversary of disappearances of Belarusian oppositionists, and so-called "Chain of Concerned People"
 spreading of informational leaflets for Poles about Human rights in Belarus
 cooperation with Polish youth organizations

Polish Division of "Zubr" was virtually independent from the Belarusian one, but the chosen name had some disadvantages, for ex. Polish organization were trying to contact the central in Belarus to consult common activity, and Belarusians living in Poland, working in organizations not friendly towards "Zubr", were refusing cooperation.

Because of this, the organization decided in November 2003 to transform into an association with more neutral name "Union for Democracy in Belarus".

See also
Liberal revolutionary movements in post-communist Eastern Europe
Alyaksandr Atroshchankau

References

Belarusian opposition
Political youth organizations
Youth organizations based in Belarus
Nonviolent resistance movements